The Vogt Lo-150 is a West German high-wing, single seat glider that was designed by Alfred Vogt and produced by the Wolf Hirth Company.

Design and development
The Lo-150 was developed from the  wing span aerobatic Vogt Lo-100 as a performance cross country sailplane.

The Lo-150 is constructed from wood, including its wooden monocoque fuselage. Its  span two-piece wing employs a Clark Y airfoil and incorporates flaps for glidepath control. Early examples use a take-off dolly and land on a fixed skid, while later ones use a fixed monowheel landing gear.

Fifteen Lo-150s were produced.

Operational history
Several Lo-150s were imported into the United States. A.J. Smith won the US Nationals flying an Lo-150 in 1961. Harold Jensen flew an Lo-150  in 1962, winning the Barringer Trophy.

Specifications (Lo-150)

See also

Notes

References

External links
Lo-150 photos on Archive.org

1950s German sailplanes
Glider aircraft